General elections were held in Guatemala on 9 November 2003, with a second round of the presidential election held on 28 December. Óscar Berger won the presidential election, representing the Grand National Alliance, a coalition of  alliance of the Patriotic Party, the Reform Movement and the National Solidarity Party. The Alliance were also victorious in the Congressional elections, winning 47 of the 158 seats. Voter turnout was 57.9% in the Congressional elections, 58.9% in the first round of the presidential elections and 46.8% in the second.

Presidential election
The ruling Republican Front of Guatemala (FRG) nominated former military ruler Efraín Ríos Montt to succeed outgoing president Alfonso Portillo Cabrera. A constitutional ban on former coup leaders (Ríos Montt during 1982–83) led to strong conflict inside the country, including the besiegement of Guatemala for a day: 24 July 2003, known as jueves negro  ("Black Thursday"). In the first round of voting, Ríos Montt came third behind the centrist mayor of Guatemala City, Óscar Berger, and the more left-wing candidate Álvaro Colom.

Results

President

Congress

References

Elections in Guatemala
Guatemala
2003 in Guatemala
Presidential elections in Guatemala